5-methyltetrahydrosarcinapterin:corrinoid/iron-sulfur protein Co-methyltransferase (cdhD (gene), cdhE (gene)) is an enzyme with systematic name 5-methyltetrahydrosarcinapterin:corrinoid/iron-sulfur protein methyltransferase. This enzyme catalyses the following chemical reaction:

 [methyl-Co(III) corrinoid Fe-S protein] + tetrahydrosarcinapterin  [Co(I) corrinoid Fe-S protein] + 5-methyltetrahydrosarcinapterin

This enzyme catalyses the transfer of a methyl group from the cobamide cofactor of a corrinoid/Fe-S protein to the N5 group of tetrahydrosarcinapterin.

References

External links 
 

EC 2.1.1